Guido Andreozzi and Guillermo Durán were the defending champions but only Durán chose to defend his title, partnering Mariano Kestelboim. Durán lost in the first round to Facundo Mena and Camilo Ugo Carabelli.

Orlando Luz and Rafael Matos won the title after defeating Juan Manuel Cerúndolo and Thiago Agustín Tirante 6–4, 6–2 in the final.

Seeds

Draw

References

External links
 Main draw

Punta Open
Punta Open